Luigi Catani (7 November 1762 – 17 December 1840) is an Italian painter of frescoes during the neoclassical period, active in Tuscany.

Biography
He was born in Prato and died in Florence. He was a pupil of Pietro Benvenuti. He was employed in the decoration of churches and aristocratic palaces in the duchy, including Palazzo Incontri in Siena, San Niccolò in Prato, the Villa Medicea in Poggio a Caiano, Palazzina dei Servi, Palazzo delle Cento, Palazzo Strozzi Sacrati, Palazzo Venturi Ginori, the Royal Palace of Pisa, and the Bardi chapel in Santa Maria Maddalena de' Pazzi.

References

18th-century Italian painters
Italian male painters
19th-century Italian painters
Italian neoclassical painters
1762 births
1840 deaths
People from Prato
19th-century Italian male artists
18th-century Italian male artists